George Aristides Caridia (20 February 1869 – 21 April 1937) was a male tennis player from Great Britain and a two-time Olympic silver medalist.

Career

At the 1908 London Olympics Caridia won those medals in the men's singles and doubles (with George Simond) event (both were contested indoor). In both finals he lost to fellow British player Arthur Gore. Caridia reached the singles semifinals of Wimbledon in 1903 (losing in four sets to Major Ritchie) and the quarterfinals in 1904 and 1909. 

Caridia was reportedly best on covered courts which suited his strong half-volley, he won the Welsh Covered Court Championships nine times between 1899 and 1909, playing at Craigside, Llandudno, Wales for 20 consecutive years. In 1900 he won the French Covered Court Championships in Paris against Harold Mahony. In addition he was a finalist at the London Covered Court Championships (1906) losing to Tony Wilding, and an all comers finalist at the British Covered Court Championships (1905) losing to Major Ritchie.

Caridia later became a member of the committee of the Wimbledon Lawn Tennis Association.  He died in 1937 and was buried at West Norwood Cemetery.

References

External links
 
 
 
 Obituary The Times  22 April 1937

1869 births
1937 deaths
19th-century British people
19th-century male tennis players
British male tennis players
British people of Greek descent
Burials at West Norwood Cemetery
Olympic silver medallists for Great Britain
Olympic tennis players of Great Britain
Tennis players at the 1908 Summer Olympics
Tennis players at the 1912 Summer Olympics
Olympic medalists in tennis
British stockbrokers
Medalists at the 1908 Summer Olympics
Sportspeople from Kolkata